Sir Donald Edward Vandepeer, KCB, KBE (21 September 1890 – 6 October 1968) was an English civil servant. Educated at University of London, he entered the civil service in 1908 and joined the Ministry of Agriculture and Fisheries; he was Permanent Secretary of the Ministry from 1945 to 1952. He led the British delegation to the United Nation Food and Agricultural Organisation's conferences.

References 

1890 births
1968 deaths
English civil servants
Alumni of the University of London
Knights Companion of the Order of the Bath
Knights Commander of the Order of the British Empire